Macroglossum tangalleum is a moth of the family Sphingidae which is endemic to Sri Lanka.

The forewing upperside is very similar to Macroglossum napolovi in the uniform reddish-brown ground colour against which the pattern of transverse bands and lines is barely discernible. The forewing underside and hindwing underside are identical to Macroglossum napolovi. The hindwing upperside very similar to that of Macroglossum napolovi, but the median yellow band is narrower and interrupted by black scaling along the veins.

References

tangalleum
Moths described in 2006
Endemic fauna of Sri Lanka
Moths of Asia